Brezovica is a former village in central Slovenia in the Municipality of Zagorje ob Savi. It is now part of the village of Tirna. It is part of the traditional region of Upper Carniola and is now included in the Central Sava Statistical Region.

Geography
Brezovica stands north of the village center of Tirna. The road from Selce to Tirna passes through Brezovica.

Name
The names Brezovica, Brezje, and names like them are relatively common in Slovenia and in other Slavic countries (e.g., Březovice in the Czech Republic, Brezovica in Serbia, etc.). The Slovene name Brezovica is derived from the common noun breza 'birch'. Like similar toponyms in Slovenia (e.g., Brezova, Brezovec, Brezovci), it originally referred to the local vegetation.

History
Brezovica had a population of 24 (in three houses) in 1890 and 17 (in two houses) in 1900. Brezovica was annexed by Tirna in 1953, ending its existence as a separate settlement.

References

External links

Brezovica on Geopedia

Populated places in the Municipality of Zagorje ob Savi
Former settlements in Slovenia